Nadya Yuti Hutagalung is an Indonesian-Australian model, actress, and presenter. She is known as the host and judge of the first two cycles of Asia's Next Top Model, one of the first VJs on MTV Asia, and a VJ on American MTV.

She was born in Sydney to an Australian mother and an Indonesian father. She married Desmond Koh at the Uma Ubud in Bali on December 16, 2006, and currently resides in Singapore. She is a practising Buddhist.

Besides her modelling, she's also a MediaWorks artist, painter, and jewellery designer. She launched her own sustainable jewelry line called OSEL, which means ŒClear Light¹ in Tibetan.

References

External links
Nadya Hutagalung Official Site

1974 births
Living people
Actresses from Sydney
Australian Buddhists
Australian female models
Australian people of Indonesian descent
Models from Sydney
VJs (media personalities)
Australian actresses of Asian descent